Fashion King may also refer to:

 Fashion King (manhwa), a 2011 manhwa
 Fashion King (film), a 2014 film
 Fashion King (TV series), a 2012 TV series
 Fashion King Korea, a 2013 TV series